The Brown Spectator was a student-run journal of conservative and libertarian political writing at Brown University. It was originally the product of a student independent project. It was first published in 1984 "as a two-page offering of student writing on brightly colored paper".

It was revived in 1986 as a Brown University, student-run opinion journal that published articles of both national and campus concern that other publications ignored. It was produced by Jennifer Polli ('87) and Karen Engel ('87), and described itself as "alternative journal" of conservative thought.

After disappearing for some time, The Brown Spectator was re-revived by Stephen Beale during the 2002-2003 school year and functioned as Brown University's only journal of conservative and libertarian thought. The Brown Spectator ran with a wide array of political and non-political topics ranging from campus issues to national issues, as well as music reviews and political cartoons.

The journal's most recent article was published in July 2014, and its website has not been updated since.

See also

 Collegiate Network
 The Stanford Review
 The Dartmouth Review
 The Cornell Review
 Berkeley Political Review
 Columbia Political Review
 Harvard Political Review

References

External links
The Brown Spectator (official website)
The Brown Spectator at Encyclopedia Brunoniana

Brown University organizations
Conservative magazines published in the United States
Libertarian magazines published in the United States
Magazines established in 1984
Magazines established in 2002
Monthly magazines published in the United States
Magazines published in Rhode Island
Student magazines published in the United States